Kirsty Hanson (born 17 April 1998) is a footballer who plays as a forward for English Women's Super League club Aston Villa, on loan from Manchester United, and the Scotland national team.

Hanson began her career in the youth ranks of Manchester United before spending a year with the Liverpool Development Squad. She made her senior debut with Sheffield FC before joining Doncaster Rovers Belles in late 2016. Hanson returned to her former club in July 2018, following the introduction of a senior team at Manchester United.

Club career

Early career 
Hanson spent her early years in the Manchester United Centre of Excellence, before joining Liverpool due to her limited opportunities to progress with her former club.

Sheffield F.C. 
In June 2016, Hanson joined FA WSL 2 club Sheffield F.C. She made a total of 10 appearances during the 2016 FA WSL season.

Doncaster Rovers Belles 
In December 2016, Hanson became the Doncaster Rovers Belles' first signing ahead of the 2017 FA WSL Spring Series. She scored three times in nine appearances in her inaugural campaign, and became a key figure in the squad for the 2017–18 season.

On 29 October 2017, Hanson scored twice in a 6–0 victory against Aston Villa. She also scored braces in a 4–1 victory against Brighton & Hove Albion in January 2018, and in a 3–1 win against Durham in April.

Manchester United 

On 1 July 2018, Hanson joined the newly-formed Manchester United to compete in the FA Women's Championship, one of seven players to return to the senior side having played for the club at youth level. She made her debut in a 1–0 FA Women's League Cup victory against former club Liverpool on 19 August, and marked her league debut with a brace in a 12–0 win against Aston Villa. Hanson made her first start of the 2019–20 season against Tottenham Hotspur in the FA Women's Super League on 13 October 2019, scoring the first goal as United won 3–0. She was named FA WSL player of the month for October 2019.

Ahead of the 2020–21 season, Hanson signed a new one-year contract with an option for a further year. On 3 February 2021 Hanson signed a new deal with Manchester United until 2024 with the option to extend it for a further year.

On 8 September 2022, Hanson joined fellow WSL side Aston Villa on loan for the 2022–23 season.

International career 
Hanson was eligible to represent England, having been born in Halifax, and Scotland, where her mother was born.

She played for Scotland at the under-17 and under-19 levels, and scored their only goal at the 2017 UEFA Women's Under-19 Championship. This came in a 1–1 draw against host nation Northern Ireland.

In November 2019, after Martha Thomas was forced to withdraw through injury, Hanson received her first senior call-up to the Scotland national team for a UEFA Women's Euro 2021 qualifier away to Albania. She made her debut starting in the 5–0 victory over Albania on 8 November and was named player of the match. Hanson scored her first international goal on 19 February 2021 during a 10–0 UEFA Euro 2022 qualifying victory away to Cyprus.

Career statistics

Club

International
Statistics accurate as of match played 21 February 2023

International goals
 As of match played 19 February 2021. Scotland score listed first, score column indicates score after each Hanson goal.

Honours

Club 
Doncaster Rovers Belles
 FA WSL 2: 2017–18

Manchester United
 FA Women's Championship: 2018–19

Individual
 FA Women's Super League Player of the Month: October 2019

References

External links 
 Profile at the Manchester United F.C. website
 
 
 

1998 births
Living people
Scottish women's footballers
Women's association football forwards
Women's Super League players
Doncaster Rovers Belles L.F.C. players
Manchester United W.F.C. players
Aston Villa W.F.C. players
Sheffield F.C. Ladies players
Scotland women's international footballers
Footballers from Halifax, West Yorkshire
English people of Scottish descent